Isanthrene pyrocera is a moth of the subfamily Arctiinae. It was described by George Hampson in 1898. It is found in Mexico.

References

 

Euchromiina
Moths described in 1898